Juuso Riksman (born April 1, 1977 in Helsinki, Finland) is a retired Finnish professional ice hockey goaltender.

Riksman played junior hockey in Espoon Palloseura and in the HIFK organization, but he started his pro career with Hermes of Kokkola, then in the 1st division. After a visit to Kiruna in the Swedish 1st division, Riksman returned to HIFK. When Tom Draper was hired as HIFK's starting goaltender, Riksman signed with MoDo Hockey in Sweden, and after two seasons in Sweden, a year in Italy with Alleghe HC and one season with Ilves, he led Ässät to a silver medal in 2006 and won the Urpo Ylönen trophy as the league's best goaltender. Subsequently, Riksman was signed by Jokerit to a two-year contract. He retired in 2016.

Suspension
In June 2007, the St. Louis Blues of the NHL signed Riksman to a contract. He was later sent to the Blues' AHL affiliate, the Peoria Rivermen. Riksman appeared in his first and only professional game in North America on November 10 against the Rockford IceHogs, allowing two goals in only eight minutes of play. He was then pulled and replaced by Marek Schwarz.

After Peoria's loss to San Antonio on November 17, Riksman announced that he had quit the team and was returning to Finland, leading to a suspension by Rivermen general manager Kevin McDonald. Since the announcement, Riksman signed first with Färjestad in Swedish Elite League, then Lokomotiv Yaroslavl in the Russian Super League before returning to Finland, and Jokerit in Helsinki.

Awards
 SM-liiga silver medal with Ässät in 2006
 Urpo Ylönen trophy for best goaltender in the SM-liiga in 2006 and 2009
 SM-liiga silver medal with Jokerit in 2007
 Kultainen kypärä -award for best player in the SM-liiga, 2009
 SM-liiga gold medal with HIFK in 2011

External links
 Hockeydb.com
 Jatkoaika.com (in Finnish)
 St. Louis Blues press release

1977 births
Ässät players
Espoo Blues players
Färjestad BK players
Finnish ice hockey goaltenders
HIFK (ice hockey) players
Ilves players
Jokerit players
Living people
Modo Hockey players
Peoria Rivermen (AHL) players
Ice hockey people from Helsinki